Flight 110 may refer to the following incidents involving commercial airliners:

Pan Am Flight 110, attacked by terrorists at a Rome airport, December 17, 1973
Aeroméxico Flight 110, crashed after losing pressurization, November 8, 1981
TACA Flight 110, lost power in both engines, May 24, 1988
Avioimpex Flight 110, crashed near Ohrid, Macedonia, November 20, 1993

0110